The cubic mean (written as ) is a specific instance of the generalized mean with .

Definition
For  real numbers  the cubic mean is defined as:
   

For example, the cubic mean of two numbers is:
.

Applications
It is used for predicting the life expectancy of machine parts.

References

Means